Brampton-Caledon Airport  is a privately owned general aviation airport in Caledon, near Brampton, Ontario, Canada, northwest of Toronto.

The club and airport was established in 1946 and occupies  of land. The airport consists of two paved runways, a flight school building, terminal building, aircraft service and maintenance facilities and 25 storage hangars. It is the busiest uncontrolled airport in Canada by number of flights.

History

The Brampton Flying Club first opened the airfield in 1946 on farmland and replaced a series of earlier landing strips near Highway 7 (Stan Archdekin Strip, Fallis Strip, Rankin Kellum Strip, First Line West and Ontario Department of Agriculture Field) built around 1945.

Tenants
 Brampton Flying Club - also owners of airport
 Great War Flying Museum
 Brampton Airport Flight Training School
 Brampton Flight College
 Humphrey's Pilot Shop
 Wings Flight Grille Restaurant
 892 (Snowy Owl) Squadron - Royal Canadian Air Cadets

See also
 List of airports in the Greater Toronto Area

References

External links
 Brampton Flying Club official website
 Page about this airport on COPA's Places to Fly airport directory

Certified airports in Ontario
Transport in Brampton